The  and  Shinkansen are Japanese high-speed train types operated by East Japan Railway Company (JR East) and West Japan Railway Company (JR West), respectively. They were jointly developed.

The E7 series has operated since 15 March 2014. It also operates on the Jōetsu Shinkansen following the March 2019 timetable revision.

A total of eleven 12-car W7 series sets (132 vehicles) have been built. The first W7 series train was delivered in April 2014.

Design
Based on the earlier E2 series trains, the E7 series trains are designed with a "Japanese" theme inside and out, combining futuristic styling with traditional design elements overseen by industrial designer Ken Okuyama together with Kawasaki Heavy Industries. Externally, the roof is finished in a "sky blue" color, and the body sides are "ivory white" with "copper" and "sky blue" lining. The body side logos consist of a number "7" in silver stylized as an arrowhead, and include the lettering "East Japan Railway Company" or "West Japan Railway Company".

Manufacture of the E7 series sets was shared between Hitachi in Kudamatsu, Yamaguchi and Kawasaki Heavy Industries in Kobe; additionally the E7 in J-TREC in Yokohama, and W7 in Kinki Sharyo in Osaka.

Increased power output enables the trains to maintain speeds of at least  on the steep gradients of the Hokuriku Shinkansen.

Car 12 (Gran Class) is equipped with full active suspension, and the other cars are equipped with semi-active suspension.

Operations 
 Kagayaki (Tokyo - Kanazawa), since March 2015
 Hakutaka (Tokyo - Kanazawa), since March 2015
 Tsurugi (Toyama - Kanazawa), since March 2015
 Asama (Tokyo - Nagano), since March 2014 (E7) and March 2015 (W7)
 Toki (Tokyo - Niigata), since March 2019 (E7)
 Tanigawa (Tokyo - Echigo-Yuzawa), since 3 March 2019 (E7)

The trains entered regular passenger service from the start of the revised JR East timetable on 15 March 2014, with three trainsets introduced on Asama services on the Hokuriku Shinkansen (then still called the Nagano Shinkansen) between Tokyo and Nagano. Initially, E7 series trainsets operated seven return Asama services daily, with a further four return workings added from 19 April 2014.

Since 14 March 2015, with the opening of the Hokuriku Shinkansen extension from Nagano to Kanazawa, E7 series trainsets are also used on Hakutaka, Kagayaki, and Tsurugi services alongside the similar design JR West W7 series trains.

Interior 
The 12-car trains have accommodation in three levels of service: Gran Class, Green car, and ordinary-class cars, with a total seating capacity of 934. AC power outlets are provided for each seat in all three classes. The Gran class seats are supplied by Toyota Boshoku. Car saloons and vestibule areas are equipped with security cameras. Between October and December 2015, luggage racks are scheduled to be added at one end of each of the even-numbered ordinary class cars and also in Green car 11, by removing a pair of seats (1D and 1E). The luggage racks are to cater to the increased number of overseas tourists with suitcases and also passengers with ski and snowboard equipment in the winter season.

E7 gallery

W7 gallery

Formations
The E7 series sets are numbered "F1" onward, and the W7 series sets are numbered "W1" onward. All sets consist of 10 motored intermediate cars with non-powered (trailer) end cars. Car 11 provides Green car (first class) accommodation, and car 12 provides Gran Class luxury accommodation. Sets are formed as shown below, with car 1 at the Tokyo end.

Cars 3 and 7 are each equipped with a single-arm pantograph.

Build histories 
, 32 E7 series sets and 11 W7 series sets have been built, with build details as follows. Eight E7 series sets and two W7 series sets were withdrawn in 2019 following flood damage sustained during Typhoon Hagibis.

History 

In December 2011, the Mainichi Shimbun reported that JR East was considering developing new E7 series 10-car sets based on the existing E2 series design for use on Hokuriku Shinkansen services. In January 2012, the head of JR-West's Kanazawa Division revealed that new trains for the Hokuriku Shinkansen would be developed in conjunction with JR East, and that test running would need to be conducted during the winter season a year before the line opening to thoroughly test the ability of the trains to cope with snowy conditions. Details of the new trains were formally announced jointly by JR East and JR West on 4 September 2012.

The first E7 series train was delivered to Sendai Depot in November 2013, and shown off to the media on 28 November. Night-time testing commenced in December 2013 on the Nagano Shinkansen, with daytime test-running between Nagano and Tokyo starting on 8 January 2014. The design of the logo to be applied to the sides of cars 1 and 12 was officially unveiled in February 2014.

The first three trains, sets F1 to F3, entered regular passenger service from the start of the revised JR East timetable on 15 March 2014. The entire fleet of 17 sets, numbered F1 to F17, was delivered by the start of the 14 March 2015 timetable revision, although sets F16 and F17 did not enter revenue service until after this date.

The first W7 series train was delivered from Kawasaki Heavy Industries in Kobe to Hakusan Depot in Hakusan, Ishikawa in April 2014.

In April 2015, JR East announced that it was ordering an additional E7 series set to be introduced from autumn 2015, replacing the remaining E2 series trainsets used on regularly scheduled Hokuriku Shinkansen Asama services.

In May 2015, the W7 series and E7 series were awarded the 2015 Blue Ribbon Award, presented annually by the Japan Railfan Club. A presentation ceremony was held at JR West's Hakusan Depot on 24 October 2015.

On 12 October 2019, eight E7 series and two W7 series trains were damaged due to floodwaters from Typhoon Hagibis, while they were stored at JR East Nagano Shinkansen Vehicle center. The sets were scrapped shortly thereafter.

In November 2021, JR East demonstrated autonomous operation with an E7 set in Niigata prefecture; 5km between Niigata Station and Niigata Shikansen Stock Yard. They started testing on 29 October.

The trains will replace the older E2 series sets in the process.

See also
 List of high speed trains

References

External links

 JR East E7 series 
 W7 official 

Shinkansen train series
East Japan Railway Company
Train-related introductions in 2014
Hitachi multiple units
J-TREC multiple units
Passenger trains running at least at 250 km/h in commercial operations
Kawasaki multiple units
25 kV AC multiple units
Kinki Sharyo multiple units